The Killer is a 2006 Indian Hindi-language black comedy action thriller film directed by Hasnain Hyderabadwala and Raksha Mistry, and starring Emraan Hashmi, Irrfan Khan and Nisha Kothari in the lead roles. The story revolves around an Indian taxi driver in Dubai, who seats a hitman in his taxi unknowingly.  He must face the consequences by doing everything The Killer tells him to do, may it be a ride or a murder. The film was released on 21 July 2006, and was a flop at the Box Office. It is adapted from Michael Mann's 2004 action thriller Collateral.

Plot
The story follows one serial killer who uses the help of innocent taxi drivers to murder his targets. When The Central Bureau of Investigation (CBI), India, has been made aware of a killer cab-driver in Malaysia who killed several people in a matter of hours and then crashed his taxi and killed himself. The same thing happened again, this time in Hong Kong, and several people were killed by another cab-driver, who also ended up being killed. Now, this time in Dubai, it is the turn of taxi driver Nikhil Joshi (Emraan Hashmi). Nikhil is an Indian living in Dubai for a good life and is madly in love with a cabaret dancer named Rhea (Nisha Kothari). He is willing to do anything for Rhea, and so is she. However, life has other plans for him when one night, a suave businessman named Vikram (Irrfan Khan) hails his cab.

Nikhil discovers that this pleasant passenger has an agenda of his own and a rather sinister one at that. Vikram holds Nikhil hostage in a bizarre plot to bump off various people who would testify against the dreaded don Jabbar (Zakir Hussain), who is at risk of being deported to India to face charges against him. As Nikhil helplessly becomes witness to one killing after another, he finds his life and dreams crumbling around him. He repeatedly pleads with Vikram to spare him and hire another taxi but fails. Faced with the prospect of losing everything he has been working towards, he finally takes control of the steering wheel of his life. He stops dreaming and starts acting, as he begins to pit his wits against the dangerous assassin.

Killing one after another, Nikhil seems to be the prime suspect. That is why Vikram plans to kill him in his taxi and flee. However, Nikhil fights back and dares Vikram by risking his life. After a series of murders of witnesses against Jabbar in the same night, the CBI officer and local Police Officer (Sanjay Batra) are closely on trail of Nikhil, who they assume to be The Killer. Nikhil destroys the laptop of Vikram, which contained the information of the witnesses in his hit-list. Vikram forces Nikhil to pose as Vikram and seek the particulars of the remaining two witnesses in the hit-list from Jabbar by meeting him personally in his mansion. Nikhil does so and procures the same and hands it over to Vikram, who had been waiting for him outside in the taxi. Nikhil decides to risk his life to save the witnesses and races his taxi to the horror of Vikram. The taxi hits a kiosk and crashes. Vikram runs off for his next prey, followed by Nikhil in the chase. He fails to save the witness, who is shot by Vikram. Nikhil sees his girl-friend Rhea's name and photo in the mobile, which fell off the fleeing Vikram. Determining to save Rhea from Vikram at any cost, Nikhil tries to contact her to warn her and flee, but her mobile gets discharged. He runs to warn her in the casino where she is dancing. The police and Vikram reach the place, and just as Vikram shoots at Rhea, Nikhil leaps and pushes her away. In the melee following the gun-shots, when the police confront Nikhil as the suspect Killer, he informs them that it is Vikram who is the actual Killer. He manages to escape from the place with Vikram in the chase after them. Finally, when Vikram confronts them and tries to shoot Rhea, Nikhil dares him to shoot him. The police shoot Vikram just as he is about to press the trigger of his gun. Thus Nikhil saves Rhea, and they are happily united.

Cast
 Emraan Hashmi as Nikhil Joshi
 Irrfan Khan as Vikram / Roopchand Swaroopchand Solanki 
 Nisha Kothari as Rhea 
 Bharti Achrekar as Nikhil's mother
 Zakir Hussain as Jabbar
 Avtar Gill as Nikhil's boss
 Sanjay Batra as Police Officer
 Bikramjeet Kanwarpal as Ranbir Oberoi, CBI Officer from India
 Prithvi Zutshi as Kamaal Khan, the singer
 Maya Gurjer as Mallika Khan
 Amit Bhalla
 Menaka
 Anupam Bhattacharya as Mussa
 Manoj Bhaskar

Soundtrack
The Soundtrack of Killer has chart busters like "Teri Yaadon Mein" & "O Sanam" sung by K.K. & Shreya Ghoshal. The music is composed by Sajid–Wajid. Lyrics by Jalees Sherwani. The music was released on T-Series on 17 May 2006.

See also
 List of Bollywood thriller films

References

External links

2006 films
Indian remakes of American films
2000s Hindi-language films
Indian action comedy films
2006 action thriller films
Films scored by Sajid–Wajid
Indian crime thriller films
Indian crime comedy films
Indian black comedy films
Films about murder
Films about hostage takings